Kalmen Opperman (December 8, 1919 – June 18, 2010) was an American clarinetist.  He was a noted performer, teacher, conductor, mouthpiece and barrel maker (which he made only for his students), composer, and writer of numerous clarinet studies.

A noted pedagogue, many of his students are currently working as soloists, recording artists, orchestral players and university teachers around the world.

For many years he was a performer in Broadway shows during what many call Broadway's "Golden Age".

He wrote over 10 highly acclaimed study books for the clarinet including his multi-volume Daily Studies and Velocity Studies.

He studied with noted clarinetists Ralph McLane and Simeon Bellison of the Philadelphia Orchestra and New York Philharmonic.

Most notably a private clarinet teacher in his studio in New York City. He taught at such schools as Boston University, Hartt School of Music, and Indiana University.

He also led the Kalmen Opperman Clarinet Choir.

His handmade mouthpieces and barrels are highly sought after items for professional clarinetists for their quality workmanship and sound.

References

American clarinetists
1919 births
2010 deaths
Boston University faculty
University of Hartford Hartt School faculty
Indiana University faculty